The 2022–23 FAW Welsh Cup is the 135th season of the annual knockout tournament for competitive football teams in Wales. The competition has achieved another record-breaking year with the 253 entries surpassing last season’s previous record entries, with an increase of 10.

The National Cup Board changed the Rules for the new season: five substitutes could be used, within three substitute periods for all rounds; and seedings for Round 2, introduced in the previous season, were retained with the 28 seeded clubs from the JD Cymru Premier (12), JD Cymru North (8) and JD Cymru South (8) drawn away from home.

Schedule

First qualifying round
The first qualifying round matches were announced on 6 July at the FAW HQ in Hensol and played on the weekend of 29, 30 & 31 July 2022. There were 194 clubs in the draw with fifteen Tier 3 clubs receiving byes into Qualifying Round 2, based on their League positions at the end of last season.

The teams receiving a bye into the second qualifying round are:
  Ardal NE: Caersws, Cefn Albion, Llanfair United, Llangollen Town, Llanrhaeadr
  Ardal NW: Denbigh Town, Llangefni Town, Llanrwst United
  Ardal SE: Abertillery Bluebirds, Caldicot Town, Risca United, Undy Athletic
  Ardal SW: Cardiff Draconians, Pontyclun, Port Talbot Town

North

Central

South

Second qualifying round
The Qualifying Round 2 draw was made at the Football Association of Wales Headquarters in Hensol on 1 August with ties to be played over the weekend of Saturday 20 August.

North

Central

South

First round
The First Round draw was made at the Football Association of Wales Headquarters in Hensol on 22 August. Matches for this round were played on Saturday 17 September 2022. Tier 2 teams entered the competition with 16 teams competing and the remaining 16 receiving a bye into the second round.

The teams that received a bye into the Second Round were:
 Cymru North: Buckley Town, Cefn Druids, Colwyn Bay, Guilsfield, Holyhead Hotspur, Holywell Town, Llandudno, Ruthin Town
 Cymru South: Barry Town United, Briton Ferry Llansawel, Cambrian & Clydach Vale, Carmarthen Town, Goytre United, Llantwit Major, Swansea University, Taff's Well

North

South

Second round
Matches for this round were played on Saturday 8 October 2022. Cymru Premier teams entered the competition in this round. The procedure of seeding the 28 clubs from the JD Cymru Premier (12), JD Cymru North (8) and JD Cymru South (8), instituted in 2021–22 the competition, was maintained. The seeded clubs were all drawn away from home in Round 2.

North

South

Third round
Matches for this round were played on Saturday 12 November 2022.

Fourth round
Matches for this round were played on Saturday 14 January 2023 except for the Cwmbran Celtic versus Pennydarren tie which was postponed multiple times and eventually completed on 25 January.

Fifth round
Matches for this round were played on 4 and 5 February 2023.

Notes

Semi-finals
Matches for this round were played on 3 and 4 March 2023.

Notes

Final
The final will be played on Sunday 30th April 2023.

Notes

References

2022-23
2022–23 European domestic association football cups
Cup